Kyle Stolk (born 28 June 1996) is a Dutch competitive swimmer who specializes in freestyle events. He won a silver medal in the boys' 200 m freestyle at the 2014 Summer Youth Olympics in Nanjing, and finished seventh as a member of the Dutch swimming squad in the 4×200 m freestyle relay at the 2016 Summer Olympics in Rio de Janeiro. Stolk currently trains for the swimming league at PSV Eindhoven, under the tutelage of his coach and three-time Olympian Marcel Wouda.

Stolk launched into the global scene as a junior swimmer at the 2014 Summer Youth Olympics in Nanjing. There, he nearly charged to the front at the final stretch of the boys' 200 m freestyle, before fading to a runner-up finish in 1:48.59, trailing the Italian swimmer Nicolangelo di Fabio by a small fraction of a second.

Two years later, Stolk was selected to the Dutch swimming roster at his senior Olympic debut in Rio de Janeiro, competing only in the men's 4×200 m freestyle relay. He swam through the third quarter of the race with a split of 1:47.59 to deliver the Dutch foursome of Dion Dreesens, youngster Maarten Brzoskowski, and anchor Sebastiaan Verschuren a seventh-place time in 7:09.10, holding off the Belgians from the end of the final field by more than two seconds.

References

External links
Athlete Bio – Rio 2016 Olympics Profile

1996 births
Living people
Olympic swimmers of the Netherlands
Swimmers at the 2014 Summer Youth Olympics
Swimmers at the 2016 Summer Olympics
Dutch male freestyle swimmers
Dutch people of South African descent
People from Edenvale, Gauteng
Sportspeople from Eindhoven
European Aquatics Championships medalists in swimming
Sportspeople from Gauteng